The Mayor of Porirua is the head of the municipal government of Porirua, New Zealand, and presides over the Porirua City Council. The mayor is directly elected using the single transferable vote electoral system. There have been six mayors since the establishment of the borough council in 1962: the current mayor is Anita Baker, who was elected in October 2019.

History
The locality was part the Makara County Council, abolished on 31 August 1962. The rural area became part of Hutt County, the urban area becoming Porirua Borough Council. Elections were held in October 1962, and Whitford Brown was elected the first Mayor of Porirua. During Brown's term, Porirua achieved city status on 2 October 1965. At the time, this required having a population of at least 20,000. 

Brown retired from the mayoralty in 1983. He was succeeded by John Burke, who had been Deputy Mayor since 1977. Burke remained mayor for 15 years (five terms) until 1998.

Jenny Brash was first elected mayor in 1998, succeeding Burke. She held the mayoralty for 12 years (four terms) until her retirement in October 2010. She was a Northern Ward councillor in 1983-89 and 1995-98.

Nick Leggett was elected mayor on 9 October 2010, defeating Deputy Mayor Litea Ah Hoi. He had been endorsed by his predecessor plus former Mayor John Burke, and was first elected as a councillor in Porirua in 1998, when he was 19 years old. Aged 31 on his election to mayor, he was at the time the youngest mayor in New Zealand. In October 2016, Leggett was succeeded by Mike Tana.

List of mayors of Porirua
Porirua has had six mayors:

List of deputy mayors of Porirua

References
 

 
Porirua